The 1980–81 Rugby League Premiership was the seventh staging of the end of season Rugby League Premiership competition.

The final was contested by Hull Kingston Rovers and Hull F.C. at Headingley, Leeds. Hull Kingston Rovers won the match 11–7, and was the first time the club had won the Premiership trophy. The prize money for the winning team was £4,000.

First round

Semi-finals

Final

Notes

References
 
 
 

1981 in English rugby league